College of the Redwoods (CR) is a public community college with its main campus in Eureka, California. It is part of the California Community Colleges System and serves three counties and has two branch campuses, as well as three additional sites. It's one of twelve community colleges in California that offer on campus housing for students.

History
The original Redwoods Community College District was formed in 1964 by a vote of the people of Humboldt County. Founding President Eugene J. Portugal and his wife Dottie Portugal shaped the look of the campus. In 1975, residents of the coastal portion of Mendocino County voted to join the District, and in 1978 Del Norte County similarly joined. The college serves these areas, as well as a portion of Trinity County.

In 2012, CR's regional accreditor Accrediting Commission for Community and Junior Colleges (ACCJC) placed the college on "Show Cause" status, warning the college that its accreditation might be withdrawn. Two years later it removed the college from probation and reaffirmed its accreditation.

Finances
Beginning with the passage of Proposition 13 by California in 1978, College of the Redwoods and most public institutions in the state have suffered declining revenue, and this has continued following the Dot-Com Bust. All of this occurs while simultaneously suffering increasing costs due to inflation, population growth, and increasingly unfunded state and federal mandates. In 2006, voters passed Bond Measure Q/B (Ballot Measure Q in Humboldt, northwest Mendocino and western Trinity counties; Ballot Measure B in Del Norte County) to allow issuance of $40,320,000 in bond funding to upgrade and renovate facilities at the main campus in Eureka and the branch campuses in Crescent City and Fort Bragg. Measure Q Bond Funds were also used to acquire the Garberville Site in Southern Humboldt County.

Academics
College of the Redwoods awards Associate of Arts and Associate of Science Degrees as well as a wide variety of career technical certificates for vocational and professional development.

Satellite campuses
CR has a satellite branch campuses, CR Del Norte in Crescent City, Del Norte County and the Klamath-Trinity Instructional Site on the Hoopa Valley Tribe reservation. Adult Education and Workforce and Community Education program are through the Eureka, CA downtown site. It also runs classes at the College of the Redwoods' Certified Organic Farm in Shively, CA. CR serves incarcerated students at Pelican Bay State Prison.

Administration
The college is part of the Redwoods Community College District, itself part of the California Community Colleges System. The district is governed by the elected seven-member Board of Trustees.

Notable alumni
 Ashley Eriksmoen, (class of 1998), furniture maker and educator
 Dave Harper, (class of 1986), professional football player
 Bryan Malessa (class of 1993), novelist
 Michael Moore, saxophonist and clarinetist, member of the Instant Composers Pool
 John James Nazarian (born 1952), celebrity private investigator
 Randy Niemann, (class of 1975), professional baseball player
 Jason Romero, (class of 1999), Banjo luthier and Juno award-winning performer
 Carmelita Little Turtle (born 1952), Apache/Rarámuri photographer

Points of interest
 Humboldt Botanical Garden

References

External links
 Official website 

 
California Community Colleges
Universities and colleges in Del Norte County, California
Buildings and structures in Eureka, California
Woodworking
Educational institutions established in 1964
Schools accredited by the Western Association of Schools and Colleges
1964 establishments in California